Feed My Lambs, Inc. is a non-profit ministry located in Marietta, Georgia, which operates tuition-free Christian preschools and grade schools for children living in impoverished areas of metro Atlanta, GA.

History
Feed My Lambs opened its first school in Marietta in 1990, gaining its legal status as a non-profit organization in April 1992 and is overseen by a board of directors with 8 members.

Mission
The mission of Feed My Lambs is to impact children by opening preschools of excellence in high-risk communities in order to educate children and their families about the love of Christ.  The schools are funded solely by donations from individuals, foundations, churches and businesses. Feed My Lambs transforms lives by nourishing children's minds, bodies, and spirits.

Schools
Currently Feed My Lambs, Inc. (FML) is operating 4 schools in the Metro-Atlanta Area serving approximately 200 children.

Metro Atlanta
Feed My Lambs currently operates four tuition-free Christian preschools in the Atlanta area. Three of these schools—located in Austell and Marietta—serve children ages 3 through 5. The fourth school, on the City of Refuge campus on Atlanta's Westside, serves children from 6 weeks to 5 years of age, including children from families in the City of Refuge's Eden Village homeless services program as well as children from surrounding neighborhoods.

External links 
 Feed My Lambs homepage

Organizations established in 1990
Charities based in Georgia (U.S. state)
1990 establishments in Georgia (U.S. state)